Christian Dünnes (born 16 June 1984) is a German former volleyball player, who represented Germany at the 2012 Summer Olympics.

References

External links 
 
 
 
 

1984 births
Living people
German men's volleyball players
Sportspeople from Siegen
Volleyball players at the 2012 Summer Olympics
Olympic volleyball players of Germany
21st-century German people